Oakland Mills is an unincorporated community in Juniata County, Pennsylvania, United States. Oakland Mills has a post office with ZIP code 17076.

References

Unincorporated communities in Juniata County, Pennsylvania
Unincorporated communities in Pennsylvania